Bernard Robert Malivoire (20 April 1938 – 18 December 1982) was a French rower who competed in the 1952 Summer Olympics.

He was born in Bergerac, Dordogne.

In 1952 he was the coxswain of the French boat which won the gold medal in the coxed pairs event.

Malivoire was the youngest medalist and gold medalist at the 1952 Games with 14 years and 95 days.

External links
 

1938 births
1982 deaths
People from Bergerac, Dordogne
French male rowers
Coxswains (rowing)
Olympic rowers of France
Rowers at the 1952 Summer Olympics
Olympic gold medalists for France
Olympic medalists in rowing
Medalists at the 1952 Summer Olympics
Sportspeople from Dordogne
20th-century French people